Turbulence 3: Heavy Metal is a 2001 thriller film directed by Jorge Montesi and starring John Mann (in his first and only leading role), Monika Schnarre, Gabrielle Anwar and Joe Mantegna. The film was released direct-to-video, and is the third installment in the Turbulence trilogy, following Turbulence and Turbulence 2: Fear of Flying.

Plot
Heavy metal fans and critics gather at Los Angeles International Airport to witness Slade Craven (John Mann), who will perform his farewell concert on a TransContinental Airlines Boeing 747 flying from Los Angeles to Toronto. The concert is scheduled to be broadcast over the internet by internet news site Z-Web-TV while news of the FAA receiving threats about permitting the concert spread. Z-Web-TV anchor Erica Black (Monika Schnarre) and cameraman Ethan (Ben Derrick), are assigned to cover the concert. The fans board the plane and later Craven and his band board while the crew does the pre-flight checks. During the safety demonstration, the fans do not pay attention to the crew.

Meanwhile, FBI agent Kate Hayden (Gabrielle Anwar) has been tracking computer hacker Nick Watts (Craig Sheffer), who has gained access to the live broadcast of the concert. After having snacks, Craven and his band start the concert, performing several of their hits and antics. Later when Craven is backstage at the first class lavatory, an unknown person corners him and assumes his personality. The anonymous person then kills Craven's manager. When Kate arrives at Nick's home, they both witness that they never thought was supposed to be part of the broadcast. Craven kills captain Collins and takes the airplane hostage. Kate places a call and tells fellow agent Frank Garner (Joe Mantegna) and his partner Dave Barrett (Mike Dopud) to investigate the shootout. Garner and Barrett head to the offices of Z-Web-TV, and meet CEO Benny Mitchell. When Barrett calls the FAA tower in San Diego to talk to Mr. Stopnow (Brad Loree), an explosion splinters the tower, killing everyone in there. Garner and Barrett think that Craven has accomplices on the ground.

Nick and Kate realize that the said "Craven" is an impostor named Simon Flanders (also played by Mann; voice by (Brian Dobson), and it is revealed that he was the anonymous person who cornered Craven and abducted him by tying up and locking him in a room in the cargo hold, and the room has a computer in it. They also discover that Simon is a member of Guardians of the Gateway, a demonic cult who see themselves as the vanguard of the Antichrist who will rule the next millennium. He learns that Simon was previously suspected of murder and charged with 5 counts of arson with all of the charges dropped due to insufficient evidence.

As Craven communicates with Kate and Nick, the three watch in horror when Erica reveals herself to be in cahoots with Simon after killing Cravens guitarist, Damen, when the latter attempts to subdue Simon, whom the fans easily identify. After Erica rounds up the hostages and forces them back into the economy class cabin, she reveals herself to the horror of the FBI and executives of the web company as a high-ranking member of the said demonic cult and being the mastermind of the hijacking before ending her statements of planning to crash the plane in Stull, Kansas. After co-pilot MacIntosh (Rutger Hauer) is assigned to crash the airplane into the said location, the plane strays off its normal flight path and heads to Stull.

Kate realizes that the cult plans to crash the plane into a small church in Stull due to their belief that demon will be released by the crash. Nick checks the internet and finds research that when the Pope visited Colorado in 1996, he refused to fly over Eastern Kansas, because this part of Kansas is said to be one of the most unholiest places in the world. Craven manages to free himself and is met by Simon just as he is about to leave. A fight follows and Craven knocks Simon unconscious. Getting out of the hold, Craven heads to the auditorium wherein backstage, he finds Erica whom he engages in a hand-to-hand combat where he disarms her of a gun and knocks her to the electric chair prop which he wires, killing her. He goes to the cockpit and finds MacIntosh, who tells him his plan to crash the plane and commits suicide. Realizing that no pilot is left to fly the plane, Craven takes the controls.

As the fans and the two remaining band members are in despair in the economy class cabin, Craven is guided by the Kansas City International Airport control tower along with Nick and Kate to land the plane. Simon enters the cockpit again and intervenes. Craven engages him in a hand-to-hand combat while the plane goes into a dive. The two land in the main cabin wherein Craven manages to disarm and subdue him with a fire extinguisher and by locking him in the first class lavatory.

The flight reaches Missouri in a stormy weather and Craven lands the plane safely at Kansas City International Airport. Everyone in the plane applauds. Nick and Kate, the Z-Web-TV, FBI, and Kansas Airport controllers also celebrate. As the plane is surrounded by emergency vehicles, the fans, crew, and the band disembark. One of the fans, Jen Shore (Michelle Harrison) is given the chance to share on the news the incident. After that, Craven disembarks and is congratulated and cheered by everyone as the film ends.

Cast
 John Mann as Slade Craven / Simon Flanders
 Monika Schnarre as Erica Black
 Gabrielle Anwar as FBI Agent Kate Hayden
 Joe Mantegna as FBI Agent Frank Garner
 Rutger Hauer as Co-Pilot MacIntosh
 Sharon Alexander as Mandy Morgan
 Rick Burgess as Kyle Martin
 Bernie Coulson as "Shred"
 Brenda Crichlow as Mary Wilson
 Kendall Cross as Karen David
 Nathaniel DeVeaux as Jack Fletcher
 Mike Dopud as FBI Agent Dave Barrett
 Marrett Green as Reporter
 Michelle Harrison as Jen Shore
 Marlowe Kaufmann as Nance Goldsmith
 Andrew Kavadas as Damen
 Fred Keating as Captain Collins
 Brad Loree as "Stopnow"
 Craig Sheffer as Nick Watts
 Hrothgar Mathews as Benny Mitchell
 Alex Zahara as Ethan
 Ben Derrick as "Stopnow"
 Craig March as Allen Jennings
 David Neale as Hobbs
 Kate Robbins as Security Woman
 Ryan Robbins as Tor
 Chris Wilding as Wilson
 Alistair Abell as Stopnow (voice)
 Brian Dobson as Simon Flanders (voice)
 Zak Santiago as Gabriel Mendoza (as Zak Santiago Alam)

References

External links
 

2001 films
2001 crime thriller films
2001 direct-to-video films
2000s disaster films
2001 independent films
American aviation films
American disaster films
British disaster films
Canadian crime thriller films
Direct-to-video action films
Direct-to-video sequel films
Films about aviation accidents or incidents
Films about aircraft hijackings
Films about terrorism
Films set on airplanes
Trimark Pictures films
2000s English-language films
Films directed by Jorge Montesi
2000s American films
2000s Canadian films
2000s British films
Heavy metal films